Hryhoriy Sverbetov (born 3 April 1939) is a Ukrainian sprinter. He competed in the men's 400 metres at the 1964 Summer Olympics representing the Soviet Union.

References

1939 births
Living people
Athletes (track and field) at the 1964 Summer Olympics
Ukrainian male sprinters
Olympic athletes of the Soviet Union
Place of birth missing (living people)
Soviet male sprinters